Boreyje (also Romanized as Boreyje‘ and Bereyjeh; also known as Baraījah, Bereycheh, Boreycheh, and Borījeh) is a village in Hoseyni Rural District, in the Central District of Shadegan County, Khuzestan Province, Iran. At the 2006 census, its population was 138, in 22 families.

References 

Populated places in Shadegan County